The 2006 Wimbledon Championships was a tennis tournament played on grass courts at the All England Lawn Tennis and Croquet Club in Wimbledon, London in the United Kingdom. It was the 120th edition of the Wimbledon Championships and were held from 26 June to 9 July 2006. It was the third Grand Slam tennis event of the year.

Roger Federer won his fourth consecutive Wimbledon title, defeating Rafael Nadal in what was to be the first of three consecutive Wimbledon finals played between the pair. Venus Williams was unsuccessful in her title defence, losing in the third round against Jelena Janković. Amélie Mauresmo won her second Grand Slam title, and first and only Wimbledon title, defeating Justine Henin-Hardenne in the final in three sets. Mauresmo thus became the first Frenchwoman since 1925 to win the Wimbledon title. It was Henin-Hardenne's second of three Grand Slam final defeats of 2006, having lost the 2006 Australian Open final to Mauresmo earlier in the year; on that occasion, Henin-Hardenne retired due to a stomach virus.

Notable stories

American performance and Serbian breakthrough

For the first time since 1911, no American player reached the quarter-finals at Wimbledon, and for the first time since the 1976 Australian Open, no American player reached a Grand Slam quarter-final. Shenay Perry was the only American player to reach the fourth round; she was defeated 6–2, 6–0 by Elena Dementieva after losing the last ten games of the match. Her defeat also meant that no American woman reached the Wimbledon final for the first time since 1998.

Venus Williams' third round defeat by Jelena Janković of Serbia (on its first Grand Slam appearance as a newly established independent nation from the former Serbia and Montenegro) caused the earliest exit by a defending women's champion at Wimbledon since Steffi Graf lost in the first round in 1994 and meant that neither of the Williams sisters (Serena Williams withdrew due to injury) would be represented in a Wimbledon final for the first time since 1999. These championships were also the first to feature three Serbian players in the fourth round of any Grand Slam tournament: along with Janković, Ana Ivanovic and Novak Djokovic also reached the fourth round, the former losing to Amélie Mauresmo and the latter losing to Mario Ančić.

Li Na's run to the quarter-finals
China's Li Na became the first player from her country to ever be seeded or reach the quarter-finals of a Grand Slam tournament. She upset the recent French Open finalist Svetlana Kuznetsova in the third round and followed it up with a win over World No. 10 Nicole Vaidišová in the fourth round, before losing her quarter-final to second seed Kim Clijsters. Li would not reach another Grand Slam quarter-final until the 2009 US Open, where again she was defeated by Clijsters.

Streaker incident
Midway during the ladies' quarter-final match between Maria Sharapova and Elena Dementieva, a streaker ran onto the Centre Court and interrupted the match, before ultimately being arrested and brought into custody by Wimbledon security guards. The streaker was later revealed to be Dutch DJ Sander Lantinga, who carried out the stunt as part of the Dutch television show Try Before You Die.

Point and prize money distribution

Point distribution
Below are the tables with the point distribution for each discipline of the tournament.

Senior points

Prize distribution
The total prize money for 2006 championships was £10,378,710. The winner of the men's title earned £655,000 while the women's singles champion earned £625,000.

* per team

Champions

Seniors

Men's singles

 Roger Federer defeated  Rafael Nadal, 6–0, 7–6(7–5), 6–7(2–7), 6–3

Women's singles

 Amélie Mauresmo  defeated  Justine Henin-Hardenne, 2–6, 6–3, 6–4

Men's doubles

 Bob Bryan /  Mike Bryan defeated  Fabrice Santoro /  Nenad Zimonjić, 6–3, 4–6, 6–4, 6–2

Women's doubles

 Yan Zi /  Zheng Jie defeated  Virginia Ruano Pascual /  Paola Suárez, 6–3, 3–6, 6–2

Mixed doubles

 Andy Ram /  Vera Zvonareva defeated  Venus Williams /  Bob Bryan, 6–3, 6–2

Juniors

Boys' singles

 Thiemo de Bakker defeated  Marcin Gawron, 6–2, 7–6(7–4)

Girls' singles

 Caroline Wozniacki defeated  Magdaléna Rybáriková, 3–6, 6–1, 6–3

Boys' doubles

 Kellen Damico /  Nathaniel Schnugg defeated  Martin Kližan /  Andrej Martin, 7–6(9–7), 6–2

Girls' doubles

 Alisa Kleybanova /  Anastasia Pavlyuchenkova defeated  Khrystyna Antoniichuk /  Alexandra Dulgheru, 6–1, 6–2

Other events

Gentlemen's invitation doubles
 Todd Woodbridge /  Mark Woodforde defeated  T. J. Middleton /  David Wheaton, 6–7(5–7), 7–5, 7–6(7–4)

Ladies' invitation doubles
 Rosalyn Nideffer /  Jana Novotná defeated  Tracy Austin /  Nathalie Tauziat, 6–4, 6–3

Senior gentlemen's invitation doubles
 Kevin Curren /  Johan Kriek defeated  Peter McNamara /  Paul McNamee, 7–5, 6–7(8–10), 7–6(11–9)

Wheelchair men's doubles

 Shingo Kunieda /  Satoshi Saida defeated  Michaël Jeremiasz /  Jayant Mistry, 7–5, 6–2

Singles seeds

Men's singles
  Roger Federer (champion)
  Rafael Nadal (final, lost to Roger Federer)
  Andy Roddick (third round, lost to Andy Murray)
  David Nalbandian (third round, lost to Fernando Verdasco)
  Ivan Ljubičić (third round, lost to Dmitry Tursunov)
  Lleyton Hewitt  (quarterfinals, lost to Marcos Baghdatis)
  Mario Ančić (quarterfinals, lost to Roger Federer)
  James Blake (third round, lost to Max Mirnyi)
  Nikolay Davydenko (first round, lost to Alejandro Falla)
  Fernando González (third round, lost to David Ferrer)
  Tommy Robredo (second round, lost to Novak Djokovic)
  Thomas Johansson (first round, lost to Jonas Björkman)
  Tomáš Berdych (fourth round, lost to Roger Federer)
  Radek Štěpánek (quarterfinals, lost to Jonas Björkman)
  Sébastien Grosjean (third round, lost to Marcos Baghdatis)
  Gastón Gaudio (second round, lost to Irakli Labadze)
  Robby Ginepri (first round, lost to Mardy Fish)
  Marcos Baghdatis (semifinals, lost to Rafael Nadal)
  Tommy Haas (third round, lost to Tomáš Berdych)
  Dominik Hrbatý (first round, lost to Daniele Bracciali)
  Gaël Monfils (first round, lost to Igor Kunitsyn)
  Jarkko Nieminen (quarterfinals, lost to Rafael Nadal)
  David Ferrer (fourth round, lost to Lleyton Hewitt)
  Juan Carlos Ferrero (third round, lost to Radek Štěpánek)
  Andre Agassi (third round, lost to Rafael Nadal)
  Olivier Rochus (third round, lost to Lleyton Hewitt)
  Dmitry Tursunov (fourth round, lost to Jarkko Nieminen)  Fernando Verdasco(fourth round, lost to Radek Štěpánek)  Paradorn Srichaphan (first round, lost to Agustín Calleri)  Kristof Vliegen (second round, lost to Nicolas Mahut)  Nicolás Massú (first round, lost to Andy Murray)  Paul-Henri Mathieu (first round, lost to Mark Philippoussis)Women's singles
  Amélie Mauresmo (champion)
  Kim Clijsters (semifinals, lost to Justine Henin-Hardenne)  Justine Henin-Hardenne (final, lost to Amélie Mauresmo)  Maria Sharapova (semifinals, lost to Amélie Mauresmo)  Svetlana Kuznetsova (third round, lost to Li Na)  Venus Williams (third round, lost to Jelena Janković)  Elena Dementieva (quarterfinals, lost to Maria Sharapova)  Patty Schnyder (second round, lost to Séverine Brémond)  Anastasia Myskina (quarterfinals, lost to Amélie Mauresmo)  Nicole Vaidišová (fourth round, lost to Li Na)  Francesca Schiavone (first round, lost to Melanie South)  Martina Hingis (third round, lost to Ai Sugiyama)  Anna-Lena Grönefeld (first round, lost to Tsvetana Pironkova)  Dinara Safina (third round, lost to Ana Ivanovic)  Daniela Hantuchová (fourth round, lost to Justine Henin-Hardenne)  Flavia Pennetta (fourth round, lost to Maria Sharapova)  Maria Kirilenko (first round, lost to Shinobu Asagoe)  Ai Sugiyama (fourth round, lost to Séverine Brémond)  Ana Ivanovic (fourth round, lost to Amélie Mauresmo)  Shahar Pe'er (second round, lost to Shuai Peng)  Katarina Srebotnik (third round, lost to Daniela Hantuchová)  Nathalie Dechy (first round, lost to Sybille Bammer)  Anabel Medina Garrigues (third round, lost to Anastasia Myskina)  Marion Bartoli (second round, lost to Karolina Šprem)  Elena Likhovtseva (third round, lost to Elena Dementieva)  Jelena Janković (fourth round, lost to Anastasia Myskina)  Li Na (quarterfinals, lost to Kim Clijsters)  Sofia Arvidsson (first round, lost to Eva Birnerová)  Tatiana Golovin (second round, lost to Nicole Pratt)  Anna Chakvetadze (third round, lost to Justine Henin-Hardenne)  Gisela Dulko (third round, lost to Séverine Brémond)  Mara Santangelo (first round, lost to Amy Frazier)Wild card entries
The following players received wild cards into the main draw senior events.

Men's singles
  Jamie Baker
  Alex Bogdanovic
  Richard Bloomfield
  Jamie Delgado
  Martin Lee
  Alan Mackin
  Andrei Pavel
  Mark Philippoussis

Women's singles
  Cara Black
  Sarah Borwell
  Naomi Cavaday
  Anne Keothavong
  Alicia Molik
  Katie O'Brien
  Agnieszka Radwańska
  Melanie South

Men's doubles
  James Auckland /  Jamie Delgado
  Lee Childs /  Andrei Pavel (Withdrew'')
  Colin Fleming /  Jamie Murray
  Josh Goodall /  Ross Hutchins
  Martin Lee /  Jonathan Marray

Women's doubles
  Sarah Borwell /  Jane O'Donoghue
  Claire Curran /  Jamea Jackson
  Amanda Keen /  Anne Keothavong
  Rebecca Llewellyn /  Karen Paterson
  Katie O'Brien /  Melanie South

Mixed doubles
  Wayne Arthurs /  Alicia Molik
  James Auckland /  Claire Curran
  Paul Hanley /  Tatiana Perebiynis
  Andy Murray /  Kirsten Flipkens
  Cyril Suk /  Helena Suková

Qualifier entries

Men's singles

 Kevin Kim
 Irakli Labadze
 Roko Karanušić
 Marcel Granollers
 Michael Berrer
 Frank Dancevic
 Alejandro Falla
 Simon Stadler
 Alexander Peya
 Kristian Pless
 Josh Goodall
 Stefano Galvani
 Wayne Arthurs
 Benedikt Dorsch
 Robert Kendrick
 Benjamin Becker

The following player received entry into the lucky loser spot:
 Jean-Christophe Faurel

Women's singles

 Romina Oprandi
 Nicole Pratt
 Séverine Brémond
 Tamarine Tanasugarn
 Clarisa Fernández
 Kristina Barrois
 Chan Yung-jan
 Vasilisa Bardina
 Ivana Abramović
 Meilen Tu
 Yaroslava Shvedova
 Kirsten Flipkens

The following player received entry into the lucky loser spot:
 Julia Vakulenko

Men's doubles

 Irakli Labadze /  Dušan Vemić
 Neil Bamford /  Jim May
 Ramón Delgado /  André Sá
 Kevin Kim /  Cecil Mamiit

The following teams received entry into the lucky loser spot:
 Sanchai Ratiwatana /  Sonchat Ratiwatana
 Zack Fleishman /  Robert Smeets
 Tomáš Cakl /  Pavel Šnobel
 Frédéric Niemeyer /  Glenn Weiner

Women's doubles

 Lucie Hradecká /  Hana Šromová
 Stéphanie Cohen-Aloro /  María José Martínez Sánchez
 Yuliana Fedak /  Tatiana Perebiynis
 Lilia Osterloh /  Ahsha Rolle

The following teams received entry into the lucky loser spot:
 Chan Chin-wei /  Hsieh Su-wei
 Melinda Czink /  Vania King
 Mariana Díaz Oliva /  Natalie Grandin

Withdrawals

Men's Singles

Before the tournament
  José Acasuso → replaced by  Dick Norman
  Igor Andreev → replaced by  Guillermo García López
  Guillermo Coria → replaced by  Lu Yen-hsun
  Taylor Dent → replaced by  Tomáš Zíb
  Victor Hănescu → replaced by  Răzvan Sabău
  Nicolas Kiefer → replaced by  Jean-Christophe Faurel
  Carlos Moyá → replaced by  Melle van Gemerden

Women's Singles

Before the tournament
  Lindsay Davenport → replaced by  Sandra Klösel
  Nuria Llagostera Vives → replaced by  Ivana Lisjak
  Nadia Petrova → replaced by  Julia Vakulenko
  Mary Pierce → replaced by  Victoria Azarenka
  Lucie Šafářová → replaced by  Kateryna Bondarenko
  Roberta Vinci → replaced by  Hsieh Su-wei
  Serena Williams → replaced by  Lilia Osterloh

During the tournament
  Viktoriya Kutuzova

References

External links
 Official Wimbledon Championships website

 
Wimbledon Championships
Wimbledon Championships
Wimbledon Championships
Wimbledon Championships